Carl August Lundström (1844 -1914) was a Finnish entomologist who specialised in Diptera especially Nematocera. He was a Professor in Helsinki. His insect collection is held by the Finnish Museum of Natural History.

Works
partial list 
Lundstrom, C. 1911. Neue oder wenig bekannte eurapäische Mycetophiliden Annales Historico-Naturales Musei Nationalis Hungarici 9: 390-419
Lundstrom, C. 1912. Neue oder wenig bekannte europaische Mycetophilidae 11.  Annales Historico-Naturales Musei Nationalis Hungarici 10: 514-522.
Lundstrom, C. 1912. Beitrage zur Kenntnis der Dipteren Finlands. - Supplement 2. Mycetophilidae. Acta Soc. Fauna Flora Fenn. 36(1): 1-39.
Lundstrom, C. 1914. Beitrage zur Kenntnis der Dipteren Finlands. - Supplement 3. Mycetophilidae. Acta Soc. Fauna Flora Fenn. 39(3): 1-26.

References
Anonym 1915: [Lundström, C. A.] Wiener Entomologische Zeitung, Wien 34: 68
Frey, R. 1945: [Lundström, C. A.] Luonnon Ystävä 1: 12-15
Silfverberg, H. 1995: [Lundstrom, C. A.] Memoranda Societatis pro Fauna et Flora Fennica, Helsingfors (= Helsinki) 71:39-49

Finnish entomologists
1914 deaths
1844 births
Dipterists